Lightning Over Water, also known as Nick's Film, is a 1980 West German-Swedish documentary-drama film written, directed by and starring Wim Wenders and Nicholas Ray. It centers on the last days of Ray's own life, who was already known worldwide for his 1955 classic film Rebel Without a Cause. It was screened out of competition at the 1980 Cannes Film Festival.

Summary 
The film is a collaboration between Wenders and Ray to document Ray's last days due to terminal cancer in 1979. The film is partially an homage to Ray who had a strong influence on Wenders' work, and partially an investigation on life and death. Ray's influence on Wenders includes Ray's "love on the run" subgenre as well as his film noir photography.

The film features excerpts from Ray's movies The Lusty Men and his unfinished final work We Can't Go Home Again. The sequence featuring the former excerpt was shot at Vassar College, at which Ray presented the movie and then gave a lecture, which itself is excerpted.

Nicholas Ray appears in a minor role in Wenders' film The American Friend. Wenders' science fiction film Until the End of the World is named for the last spoken words in Ray's 1961 Biblical epic film King of Kings.

The film crew is extensively featured onscreen. Jim Jarmusch, Ray's personal assistant at the time — and later a notable film director in his own right — can be briefly glimpsed at the 50:28 mark sitting at an editing console.

When Wenders goes to the Vassar campus to attend a lecture, a brief one-man performance is seen on-stage. It is Franz Kafka's story "A Report for an Academy", about an ape who becomes a man.

The American independent film director Jon Jost has recently come out against Wenders' status as the sole co-director, saying that Wenders "used his celebrity" to push Jost and Raúl Ruiz (director) out of the project that they had been the creators of.

References

External links 
 Official website
 

Documentary films about film directors and producers
1980 films
1980 documentary films
Swedish documentary films
German documentary films
West German films
1980s German-language films
Films directed by Wim Wenders
Films directed by Nicholas Ray
Documentary films about death
1980s German films
1980s Swedish films